KTOC-FM is a radio station broadcasting a religious format. Licensed to Jonesboro, Louisiana, United States, the station serves Ruston, Louisiana.

Translator
 94.3 - K232FN - Many, Louisiana

External links
http://sonlifetv.com

Radio stations in Ruston, Louisiana
Christian radio stations in Louisiana
2005 establishments in Louisiana
Radio stations established in 2005